is a passenger railway station in located in the city of Higashiōmi,  Shiga Prefecture, Japan, operated by the private railway operator Ohmi Railway. 
It is the station of Biwako Gakuin University.

Lines
Daigaku-mae Station is served by the Ohmi Railway Main Line, and is located 28.4 rail kilometers from the terminus of the line at Maibara Station.

Station layout
The station consists of one side platform serving a single bi-directional track. The station is unattended.

Platforms

Adjacent stations

History
Daigaku-mae Station was opened on March 29, 1990.

Passenger statistics
In fiscal 2019, the station was used by an average of 102 passengers daily (boarding passengers only).

Surroundings
 Biwako Gakuin University
 Higashiomi City Nunobiki Athletic Park Athletics Stadium

See also
List of railway stations in Japan

References

External links

 Ohmi Railway official site 

Railway stations in Japan opened in 1990
Railway stations in Shiga Prefecture
Higashiōmi